Johan Knutson (28 September 1816, Allerum - 13 September 1899, Helsinki) was a Swedish-born Finnish landscape painter.

Life and work 
He studied in Copenhagen in 1838, then in the lithography department at the Royal Swedish Academy of Fine Arts from 1839 to 1840. Upon graduating, at the age of twenty-four, he moved to Finland. There, he became a friend of Johan Ludvig Runeberg, and was influenced by his poetry.

In the early 1840s, he depicted street life in Helsinki in humorous graphic sheets, the continued publication of which was, however, banned by the Police Commissioner. From 1845 to 1852, he was involved in illustrating  (Finland Depicted in Drawings), with text by Zachris Topelius. He created a total of 48 landscape images for the book.

He had his first solo exhibit in 1858. He also participated in exhibitions in Sweden; notably the General Industrial Exposition of Stockholm (1866).

References

Further reading 
 Ilmari Heikinheimo, Suomen elämäkerrasto (Finnish Biography), Werner Söderström Osakeyhtiö, 1955, pp.395-396

External links

 Works by Knutson @ the Finnish National Gallery

1816 births
1899 deaths
Swedish painters
Finnish painters
Landscape painters
Lithographers
Swedish emigrants to Finland
People from Helsingborg Municipality